Cavendish College, Cambridge was a public hostel of the University of Cambridge, active from 1873 to 1892.

Its former buildings now house Homerton College, Cambridge.

History

Founding 

It was founded by the British clergyman, educational reformer and writer Joseph Lloyd Brereton with the intention of connecting the county school system with the universities. Brereton described his scheme in his book County Education.  After an unsuccessful attempt at Oxford, he founded it at Cambridge in 1873.

Brereton had suggested the name of Arnold College, after Thomas Arnold who had been his headmaster at Rugby School, but in the end the college was named after William Cavendish, 7th Duke of Devonshire, who was the chancellor of the university and the biggest funder of the new college.

The college opened in 1873 at Norwich House, Panton Street.

Cavendish was not recognised as a full college by the university; along with its contemporary Selwyn College, it was recognised as a public hostel of the university, students in residence being considered non-collegiate students but eligible for university degrees. The undergraduates were younger than was customary, and the cost of board and tuition, which was covered by an inclusive charge of eighty guineas a year, was much lower than in the established colleges.

Move to Hills Road 

In 1876, the college purchased a site on Hills Road, from Trinity College and commissioned the architectural firm of Giles and Gough to design buildings for the new site, completed between 1876 and 1878.

The original buildings were constructed in the Gothic Revival style, using a combination of red Suffolk brick and Bath stone dressings. Though Brereton had published in 1874 an extensive plan of the proposed college, the buildings at the time of opening were significantly more spartan, lacking important facilities including a hall.

Several years later, Cambridge architect William Wren designed additions to the eastern end of the college buildings in the Neo-Gothic style.

The Great Hall was constructed in 1889, and was at the time the largest college hall in Cambridge.  It features a hammer-beam roof, American walnut panelling, a gallery, rose windows and a flèche.

Demise 

The venture received educational and ecclesiastical support. However, the proprietary principle was not welcomed by some, and the public schools withheld their recognition. Other factors were the distance of the college from the centre of Cambridge, (more than 1 mile), and inferior accommodation. The scheme proved financially unsuccessful, and the college was dissolved in 1892.

The buildings and furnishings were sold in 1895 to the Congregational Board of Education to house Homerton College, a teacher training college until then based in Homerton, East London. The college was initially called Homerton New College at Cavendish college, but this was soon simplified to Homerton College, Cambridge. In 2010, Homerton College finally became a full college of Cambridge University.

Notable people 

 Joseph Lloyd Brereton – founder
 Albert Moulton Foweraker, artist – student (1890)
 William Leslie Poole, father of Uruguayan football – student
 Edward Waymouth Reid, British physiologist – student (1879-1883)
 John Turner, archdeacon of Basingstoke – student
 William Henry Whitfeld, mathematician and bridge expert – tutor and lecturer

References

Educational institutions established in 1873
Educational institutions disestablished in 1892
1873 establishments in England
Former colleges of the University of Cambridge